Presidential elections were held in Iceland in 1944. Sveinn Björnsson, was elected and appointed by the Parliament for a one-year term.

Presidential elections in Iceland
Presidential election
Iceland
Uncontested elections